Little Man is a 2006 American comedy film written, produced and directed by Keenen Ivory Wayans, and also written and produced by Wayans Brothers Marlon and Shawn Wayans, who also both starred in the lead roles. The film co-stars Kerry Washington, John Witherspoon, Tracy Morgan, Lochlyn Munro, Chazz Palminteri and Molly Shannon. A very short jewel thief hides the proceeds of his latest robbery, and then pretends to be a very large baby in order to retrieve it.

The film was theatrically released in the United States on July 14, 2006 to commercial success but largely negative reviews, including three Golden Raspberry Awards.

Plot
In Chicago, Calvin "Babyface" Simms is a very short convicted jewel thief. He is seen getting released from prison and meeting up with his goofball cohort Percy. Percy tells Calvin of a job involving stealing a valuable diamond, ordered by a mobster named Mr. Walken. After the successful robbery, the duo are almost arrested by the police, but not before Calvin manages to stash the diamond in the purse of a nearby woman. The thieves follow the handbag's owner to her home where they discover a couple, Darryl and Vanessa Edwards, the former of whom is eager to have a child.

Calvin and Percy hatch a plot to pass Calvin off as a baby left on the couple's doorstep in order to get the diamond back. After learning that Child Services is closed for the weekend, Darryl and Vanessa decide to look after Calvin in the meantime. However, Vanessa's dad Francis "Pops" has a bad feeling about Calvin. Friends of the couple find Calvin strange as well. Despite this, Calvin eventually takes a liking to having a family and starts to feel remorse for using them, especially when they throw him a birthday party (coincidentally on his actual birthday) as Calvin never had parents who’d throw him a party. Walken grows impatient and demands the diamond from Percy. Percy attempts to recover Calvin by posing as his father, but is thrown out by Darryl. Walken's men witness this altercation and as a result believe that Darryl is Calvin.

Darryl and Vanessa decide to adopt Calvin but upon coming home from a date, they find Pops and Calvin getting into a clash as the former has discovered Calvin's secret. Pops is sent to a retirement home, but before leaving he tells Darryl to "check the teddy bear", referring to a gift he gave to Calvin earlier at his party. Darryl discovers the bear is actually a nanny cam and witnesses Calvin admit to his deception. Walken and his henchmen come by the house after Percy lies to get out of trouble; claiming that Darryl is his partner who has the diamond. In a series of comedic maneuvers, Calvin manages to rescue Darryl and have Walken and his men arrested. Darryl is given a substantial reward for the recovery of the diamond, and since Calvin saved his life, he doesn't turn him over to the police.

Before he leaves, Calvin thanks Darryl for taking care of him even though he wasn't really a baby and admits that he thinks Darryl would make a great father for a real child someday. As Calvin walks away, he begins to cry hysterically knowing he will miss the family very much. Darryl then decides to let Calvin stay and the two men become the best of friends. The film ends at some point in the future with Calvin and Pops playing with Darryl and Vanessa's real baby, who looks exactly like Darryl.

Cast

Production
The story premise was lifted from a 1954 Bugs Bunny cartoon called Baby Buggy Bunny, in which Bugs takes in a foundling unaware that he is actually a wanted dwarf bank robber.

Filming began in the Vancouver area on September 17, 2005, and finished on January 21, 2006.

The scenes with Calvin Simms were played twice: once by nine year old 75 cm (2 ft 6 in) tall dwarf actor Linden Porco together with the other actors, and once by Marlon Wayans alone, using a "greenscreen" technique with a green background and green clothes. In post production, Porco's head on the images was replaced by that of Marlon. Porco's body was painted brown in order to match Marlon's face. Shawn Wayans' face was also superimposed in the final scene.

Soundtrack 
 "My House" by Lloyd Banks and 50 Cent
 "Ridin'" by Chamillionaire and Krayzie Bone
 "The Message" by Echo & the Bunnymen
 "Movin' on Up" by Jeff Berry and Ja'net Dubois
 "Celebration" by Robert Kool Bell
 "Home Sweet Home/Bittersweet Symphony" by Limp Bizkit
 "Lifetime" by Maxwell
 "In This Moment" by Ill Niño
 "Purple Haze" by Maxwell
 "Buddy (D-Rex Theme Song)" by Dwayne Wayans and Eric Willis
 "Best Friend" by Harry Nilsson
 "Pump It" by The Black Eyed Peas
 "Happy Birthday to You" by Mildred J. Hill and Patty S. Hill
 "Praise You" by Fatboy Slim
 "Candy Shop" (instrumental) by 50 Cent and Olivia

Reception

Box office
Little Man film grossed $58,645,052 domestically and a total $101,595,121 worldwide. The film's budget was $64 million. The film was released in the United Kingdom on September 1, 2006, and opened on #2, behind You, Me and Dupree.

Critical response
On Rotten Tomatoes, the film has an approval rating of 12% based on reviews from 90 critics. The site's consensus is "Another gimmicky comedy from the Wayans brothers, Little Man comes with the requisite raunchiness, but forgot to bring the laughs." On Metacritic, it has a score of 26 out 100 based on reviews from 22 critics, indicating "Generally unfavorable reviews". Audiences surveyed by CinemaScore gave the film a grade B+ on scale of A to F.

The film received a 4.2 out of 10 on "Common Sense Media".
Slant Magazine gave the film a 1.5 out of 4.

In an especially scathing review on BBC Radio 5 Live Mark Kermode described the film as "possessed by the devil".

Awards
 
The film was nominated for seven 2006 Golden Raspberry Awards: Worst Picture, Worst Actor (Marlon Wayans & Shawn Wayans), Worst Actor (Rob Schneider, also nominated for his performance in The Benchwarmers), Worst Director (Keenen Ivory Wayans), Worst Screen Couple (Shawn Wayans & EITHER Kerry Washington OR Marlon Wayans), Worst Screenplay and Worst Remake or Rip-off (of the 1954 Bugs Bunny cartoon Baby Buggy Bunny). It later won three of the awards, Worst Actor, Worst Screen Couple and Worst Remake or Rip-off.

Home media
The film was released on Blu-ray, UMD and DVD in the United States on November 7, 2006, and also in the United Kingdom on 15 January 2007, and it was distributed by Sony Pictures Home Entertainment.

References

External links
 
 
 
 

2006 films
2000s crime comedy films
African-American films
American crime comedy films
Films directed by Keenen Ivory Wayans
Films scored by Teddy Castellucci
Films set in Chicago
Films shot in Vancouver
Columbia Pictures films
Revolution Studios films
2006 comedy films
Golden Raspberry Award winning films
2000s English-language films
2000s American films